William Harrison (1802–1884) was an English antiquary. He helped establish the Manx Society in 1858; and wrote for that society a number of antiquarian works relating to the Isle of Man, beginning with Bibliotheca Monensis in 1861.

Life 
William Harrison, son of Isaac Harrison, hat manufacturer and merchant, was born at Salford, Lancashire, on 11 December 1802. Early in life he sought his fortune at the Cape of Good Hope. Returning to England he settled down about 1845 on a small estate of his own in the Isle of Man, where he became a member of the House of Keys, and afterwards a justice of the peace. Through his exertions the Manx Society was formed in 1858 for the publication of documents relating to the Isle of Man. He married Mary Sefton Beck in 1832, and died at Rockmount, near Peel, Isle of Man, on 22 November 1884.

Works 
He contributed fourteen volumes to the works of the Manx Society, including:

 The Bibliotheca Monensis, a Bibliographical Account of Works relating to the Isle of Man, 1861, 2nd edition 1876;
 Manx Proverbs and Sayings, Ballads, &c. 1868;
 Account of the Diocese of Sodor and Man, 1879;
 Manx Miscellanies, 1880.

He was an occasional writer on antiquarian matters in the Manchester Guardian and other papers.

References

Sources 

 

Attribution:

Further reading 

 Coakley, Frances, ed. (2001). "William Harrison 1802-1884". A Manx Note Book. isle-of-man.com. Retrieved 2 October 2022.
 "William Harrison: Scholar and Antiquary". The Journal of the Manx Museum, 4(57). December 1938. pp. 83–84.
 "William Harrison - Photographs - iMuseum". imuseum.im. 2020. Retrieved 2 October 2022.
 Manchester Guardian, 27 November 1884.
 Manx Sun, 20 December 1884. p. 13.
 Isle of Man Examiner, 15 September 1939. p. 9.

1802 births
1884 deaths
19th-century English non-fiction writers
19th-century antiquarians
English antiquarians